Who Moved My Cheese? An Amazing Way to Deal with Change in Your Work and in Your Life, published on September 8, 1998, is a bestselling seminal work and motivational business fable by Spencer Johnson. The text describes the way one reacts to major change in one's work and life, and four typical reactions to those changes by two mice and two "Littlepeople," during their hunt for "cheese." A New York Times business bestseller upon release, Who Moved My Cheese? remained on the list for almost five years and spent over 200 weeks on Publishers Weeklys hardcover nonfiction list. As of 2018, it has sold almost 30 million copies worldwide in 37 languages and remains one of the best-selling business books.

Story
Allegorically, Who Moved My Cheese? features four characters: two mice, "Sniff" and "Scurry," and two Littlepeople, human metaphor, "Hem" and "Haw."  (The names of the Littlepeople are taken from the phrase "hem and haw," a term for indecisiveness.)  They live in a maze, a representation of one's environment, and look for cheese, representative of happiness and success. Initially without cheese, each group, the mice and humans, paired off and traveled the lengthy corridors searching for cheese. One day both groups happen upon a cheese-filled corridor at "Cheese Station C." Content with their find, the humans establish routines around their daily intake of cheese, slowly becoming arrogant in the process.

One day Sniff and Scurry arrive at "Cheese Station C" to find no cheese left, but they are not surprised. Noticing the cheese supply dwindling, they have mentally prepared beforehand for the arduous but inevitable task of finding more cheese. Leaving "Cheese Station C" behind, they begin their hunt for new cheese together. Later that day, Hem and Haw arrive at Cheese Station C only to find the same thing, no cheese. Angered and annoyed, Hem demands, "Who moved my cheese?" The humans have counted on the cheese supply to be constant, and so are unprepared for this eventuality. After deciding that the cheese is indeed gone they get angry at the unfairness of the situation. Haw suggests a search for new cheese, but Hem is dead-set in his disappointment and dismisses the proposal.

Meanwhile, Sniff and Scurry have found "Cheese Station N," and new cheese. But back at Cheese Station C, Hem and Haw are affected by their lack of cheese and blame each other for their problem. Hoping to change, Haw again proposes a search for new cheese. However, Hem is comforted by his old routine and is frightened about the unknown. He knocks the idea again. After a while of being in denial, the humans remain without cheese. One day, having discovered his debilitating fears, Haw begins to chuckle at the situation and stops taking himself so seriously. Realizing he should simply move on, Haw enters the maze, but not before chiseling "If You Do Not Change, You Can Become Extinct" on the wall of Cheese Station C for his friend to ponder.

Still fearful of his trek, Haw jots "What Would You Do If You Weren't Afraid?" on the wall and, after thinking about that, he begins his venture. Still plagued with worry (perhaps he has waited too long to begin his search...), Haw finds some bits of cheese that nourish him and he is able to continue his search. Haw realizes that the cheese has not suddenly vanished, but has dwindled from continual eating. After a stop at an empty cheese station, Haw begins worrying about the unknown again. Brushing aside his fears, Haw's new mindset allows him to again enjoy life. He has even begun to smile again! He is realizing that "When you move beyond your fear, you feel free." After another empty cheese station, Haw decides to go back for Hem with the few bits of new cheese he has managed to find.

Uncompromising, Hem refuses the new cheese, to his friend's disappointment. With knowledge learned along the way, Haw heads back into the maze. Getting deeper into the maze, inspired by bits of new cheese here and there, Haw leaves a trail of writings on the wall ("The Handwriting On the Wall"). These clarify his own thinking and give him hope that his friend will find aid in them during his search for new cheese. Still traveling, Haw one day comes across Cheese Station N, abundant with cheese, including some varieties that are strange to him, and he realizes he has found what he was looking for. After eating, Haw reflects on his experience. He ponders a return to see his old friend. But Haw decides to let Hem find his own way. Finding the largest wall in Cheese Station N, he writes:

Cautious from past experience, Haw now inspects Cheese Station N daily and explores different parts of the maze regularly to prevent any complacency from setting in. After hearing movement in the maze one day, Haw realizes someone is approaching the station. Unsure, Haw hopes that it is his friend Hem who has found the way.

Who Moved My Cheese Inc.

In 1999, Who Moved My Cheese Inc was founded to handle the Who Moved My Cheese? book order demands from businesses. In 2005, the company was reorganized as Spencer Johnson Partners with the idea of bringing in partners and additional content from Dr. Spencer Johnson, the author. Spencer Johnson Partners focused on creating additional programs and services that would continue to help clients navigate change, including Gaining Change Skills. Then, in 2009, the company was purchased and renamed Red Tree leadership.

Reception
In the corporate environment, management has been known to distribute this book to employees during times of "structural reorganization", or during cost-cutting measures, in an attempt to portray unfavorable or unfair changes in an optimistic or opportunistic way. This has been characterized by Barbara Ehrenreich in her book Bright-sided: How the Relentless Promotion of Positive Thinking Has Undermined America as an attempt by organizational management to make employees quickly and unconditionally assimilate management ideals, even if they may prove detrimental to them professionally.  Ehrenreich called the book "the classic of downsizing propaganda" and summarizes its message as "the dangerous human tendencies to 'overanalyze' and complain must be overcome for a more rodentlike approach to life. When you lose a job, just shut up and scamper along to the next one."

Dilbert cartoonist Scott Adams said that patronizing parables are one of the top 10 things he receives complaints about by email. Adams' retort to the message in the parable is that it is a "patronizing message for the proletariat to acquiesce".

Parodies
There are multiple parody works called Who Cut the Cheese?.

Andy Borowitz published a parody, Who Moved My Soap?: The CEO's Guide to Surviving Prison, Simon & Schuster, c2003.

Darrel Bristow-Bovey published a parody, I Moved Your Cheese, Penguin Random House South Africa, Apr 13, 2012.

The webcomic Abstruse Goose has a strip which is a parody of the book.

Comedian/TV host/motivational speaker Ross Shafer wrote Nobody Moved Your Cheese!

References

External links
 Who Moved My Cheese?
 A light-hearted look at some real-life cheese rules
 Who Moved My Cheese? The Movie

1998 non-fiction books
Business books
Business fables
G. P. Putnam's Sons books
Who Moved My Cheese